Amy and the Orphans is a 2018 play by Lindsey Ferrentino. The play officially opened Off-Broadway at Roundabout Theatre Company's Laura Pels Theatre on March 1, 2018.
The play is about three adult siblings, one with Down syndrome, re-uniting for their father's funeral. The original production featured:  Vanessa Aspillaga as Kathy, Jamie Brewer as Amy, Josh McDermitt as Bobby, Mark Blum as Jacob, Diane Davis as Sarah, and Debra Monk as Maggie.  It was directed by Scott Ellis.

Ferrentino was inspired to write the play by her aunt who has Down syndrome.

Jamie Brewer won the 2018 Drama Desk Award for Outstanding Featured Actress in a Play.

Netflix will adapt the play into a feature film which is also written by Ferrentino.

References

Reviews 
 New York Times Review
 Broadway World Review Roundup
 Hollywood Reporter Review

External links 
 Amy and the Orphans at Roundabout Theatre Company
 Amy and the Orphans on Lindsey Ferrentino's website

2018 plays
Comedy plays
Off-Broadway plays